Tip of the Iceberg is the second EP by American rock band New Found Glory, released on April 29, 2008 through independent label Bridge Nine Records.

The release includes three original tracks and three covers of classic melodic hardcore bands Gorilla Biscuits, Shelter and Lifetime.

Release
On February 23, 2008, Tip of the Iceberg was announced for release in two months' time; alongside this, the track listing for it and the accompanying album from the International Superheroes of Hardcore were posted online. On April 10, 2008, "Tip of the Iceberg" was posted on the band's Myspace profile. A launch show was held on May 19, 2008 at Safari Sam's in Los Angeles, California. That same day, the music video for "Dig My Own Grave" was posted online.

Track listing
All lyrics and music written and composed by New Found Glory; except where noted.

"Tip of the Iceberg" — 1:24
"Dig My Own Grave" — 2:21
"If You Don't Love Me" — 1:55
"No Reason Why" (Gorilla Biscuits) — 2:03
"Here We Go" (Shelter) — 2:29
"Cut the Tension" (Lifetime) — 1:53

Japanese bonus track
 "Jóga" (Björk) — 4:04

References

New Found Glory EPs
2008 EPs
Bridge 9 Records EPs